Eugenius! is an original musical featuring book, music and lyrics by Ben Adams and Chris Wilkins. The show is a comedy book musical.

Productions

London Palladium 
After two years of extensive workshops with the writers and original creatives, the musical had its world premiere as a concert performance at the London Palladium on 29 June 2016, produced by Kevin Wood, George Wood & Warwick Davis (who also starred as Evil Lord Hector). The concert also featured Marcus Brigstocke as the narrator. The concert was choreographed by Aaron Renfree and Direcred by Ian Talbot.

Runs at The Other Palace 
A fully staged production received its premiere at The Other Palace in London from 22 January to 3 March 2018, returning  for a second run from 1 September to 7 October 2018, before being extended until 21 October 2018, starring Rob Houchen in the leading role of Eugene & Laura Baldwin as Janey. The production was choreographed by Aaron Renfree directed by Ian Talbot, assisted by the shows writer Chris Wilkins with Michael Jibson serving as a creative consultant. The show gained a cult following from an audience of fans of all ages who were hooked on the catchy tunes and funny script.

Turbine Theatre  
The show will be produced in the Turbine Theatre, Battersea in Spring 2023 directed by Hannah Chissick.

Cancelled West End engagement 
Following the run at The Other Palace, a transfer was planned for a limited 10-week season at the Ambassadors Theatre in London's West End from 27 October 2018 to 7 January 2019, however it was later announced that this would not be happening.

Cast and characters

References

External links 
 

2016 musicals
Original musicals
British musicals
West End musicals